Amblyseius alpigenus is a species of mite in the family Phytoseiidae.

References

alpigenus
Articles created by Qbugbot
Animals described in 1987